Steampunk (2008) is an anthology of steampunk fiction edited by Ann and Jeff VanderMeer, and published by Tachyon Publications.  It was nominated in 2009 for a World Fantasy Award.

Contents
 “Preface: Steampunk: “It’s a Clockwork Universe, Victoria”” by Ann & Jeff VanderMeer
 “Introduction: The 19th-Century Roots of Steampunk” by Jess Nevins
 “Benediction: Excerpt from The Warlord of the Air” by Michael Moorcock
 “Lord Kelvin’s Machine” by James P. Blaylock
 “The Giving Mouth” by Ian R. MacLeod
 “A Sun in the Attic” by Mary Gentle
 “The God-Clown Is Near” by Jay Lake
 “The Steam Man of the Prairie and the Dark Rider Get Down: A Dime Novel” by Joe R. Lansdale
 “The Selene Gardening Society” by Molly Brown
 “Seventy-Two Letters” by Ted Chiang
 “The Martian Agent, A Planetary Romance” by Michael Chabon
 “Victoria” by Paul Di Filippo
 “Reflected Light” by Rachel E. Pollock (misprinted as Rachel Pollack in the first edition printing)
 “Minutes of the Last Meeting” by Stepan Chapman
 “Excerpt from the Third and Last Volume of Tribes of the Pacific Coast” by Neal Stephenson
 “The Steam-Driven Time Machine: A Pop Culture Survey” by Rick Klaw
 “The Essential Sequential Steampunk: A Modest Survey of the Genre within the Comic Book Medium” by Bill Baker

References

External links
 
 

Steampunk literature
2008 anthologies
Tachyon Publications books